XHRRT-FM (branded as El Heraldo Radio) is a Mexican Spanish-language radio station that serves the Tampico, Tamaulipas market area.

History
XERRT-AM received its concession on April 16, 1961. It broadcast from Ciudad Madero on 1190 kHz as a 500-watt daytimer. By the end of the 1960s, XERRT had moved to 1270 kHz and began broadcasting with 250 watts during the day and 200 at night. A 1990s power hike brought XERRT to 2,000 watts during the day and 500 at night.

In 2011, XERRT was authorized to move to FM as XHRRT-FM on 92.5 MHz.

On June 4, 2018, XHRRT changed from Voz FM to One FM with an electronic music format.

On August 1, 2019, XHRRT changed again from One FM to the news and talk programming of El Heraldo Radio relaying XHDL-FM from Mexico City.

External links

References

Spanish-language radio stations
Radio stations in Tampico
1961 establishments in Mexico
Radio stations established in 1961